Minuscule 288 (in the Gregory-Aland numbering), ε 524 (Soden), is a Greek minuscule manuscript of the New Testament, on paper. Palaeographically it has been assigned to the 15th century. 
It has marginalia.

Description 

The codex contains the text of the Gospel of Matthew, Gospel of Luke, and Gospel of John on 250 paper leaves. The Gospel of Mark was originally considered missing, but has since been identified as Minuscule 2532, a number now retired as the Mark portion has joined the other three gospels under the number Minuscule 288. The text is written in one column per page, in 18 lines per page.

It contains subscriptions at the end of each Gospel, and pictures.

Text 

The Greek text of the codex is a representative of the Byzantine text-type. Aland placed it in Category V.
According to Claremont Profile Method it represents in Luke 1 and Luke 20 textual family Kx. In Luke 10 no profile was made. It belongs to the textual cluster 17 along with manuscripts 30, 70, 120, 287, and 880. It creates a pair with 30.

History 

The manuscript was written by George Hermonymus.

The Gospel of Matthew once belonged to Antonio Dizomaeo. The Gospel of Luke once belonged to Germain de Brixius, then to Jacques Tusan († 1546). The Gospel of John belonged to C. Emmery Sanguintiniani, then to Henri Jacques Nonpareil de Caumont, Herzog de la Force († 1726), then to Antoine Moriau, who presented it to the library of the Institut de Paris.

It was added to the list of New Testament manuscripts by Scholz (1794-1852). 
It was examined by Wettstein, and Griesbach. Paulin Martin described part of the codex housed in BnF (Gospel of Luke). C. R. Gregory saw the manuscript in 1883 (Oxford) and in 1884 (Paris).

The manuscript is currently housed in these places: 
 Matthew: Bodleian Library (Canonici Gr. 33) at Oxford
 Mark: Corpus Christi College (MS. 224) at Cambridge
 Luke: Bibliothèque nationale de France (Gr. 99) at Paris
 John: Institut de France (Ms. 536) at Paris.

See also 

 List of New Testament minuscules
 Biblical manuscript
 Textual criticism

References

Further reading 

 Jean-Pierre-Paul Martin, Description technique des manuscrits grecs, relatif au Nouveau Testament, conservé dans les bibliothèques des Paris (Paris 1883), p. 70.

Greek New Testament minuscules
15th-century biblical manuscripts
Bibliothèque nationale de France collections
Bodleian Library collection